Malvika Subba (Limbu) is a Nepalese media personality, beauty queen, actress, television host, social activist and entrepreneur. She graduated from Pokhara University with Masters in Mass Communication and Journalism.

Career
At the age of 21, Malvika was crowned as Miss Nepal 2002, ever since then she has worked for Call Kantipur as a TV host in Kantipur Television. In 2008, she worked for Voice of India, MTV EXIT as the Ambassador for Human Trafficking
Subba has also been associated with Youth SpokesPerson for Action Aid's Hunger-Free Campaign, HIV/AIDS Youth Leader by UNICEF and worked with Shangrila Housing as Sales and Marketing Manager in 2009–2011.

In 2008, she has acted in movies and dramas like God Lives in The Himalayas, Good Bye Kathmandu and Hamri Shiwani.

From April to October 2011, she worked as the chief editor for one of Nepal's leading fashion and lifestyle magazine, Navyaata. In 2011, Subba established her own retail clothing store with in-house designers. She is the Co-Founder and Creative Director of House of Alternative Apparel also known as HAA  and Himalayan Climate Initiative(HCI).

From 2015, she is the host and head judge of Mega Model which is now at its third season.

Controversy
In May 2022, a freelance makeup artist alleged that she had been repeatedly raped by a pageant organizer when she was 16 in 2014. She also alleged that she had told Subba about the ordeal at the time but Subba had refused to hear her out and dismissed her claims. Subba was criticized for publicly hosting events around feminism and women's rights while ignoring the plight of a victim. She later issued an apology and pledged to step away from such public platforms for the near future.

Filmography
Goodbye Kathmandu

References

External links

 Official Website

1981 births
Living people
People from Dharan
Miss Nepal winners
Nepalese female models
Nepalese film actresses
Nepalese television actresses
Actresses in Nepali cinema
Actresses in Nepali television
21st-century Nepalese actresses
Nepalese businesspeople
Actors from Kathmandu
Nepalese beauty pageant winners
Limbu people
Tribhuvan University alumni
Alumni of Pokhara University